Edward Mason Merrill (May 22, 1860 – January 29, 1946) was a second baseman in Major League Baseball in the 19th century.

Sources

1860 births
1946 deaths
Baseball players from Kentucky
Major League Baseball second basemen
19th-century baseball players
Louisville Eclipse players
Worcester Ruby Legs players
Indianapolis Hoosiers (AA) players
Fort Wayne Hoosiers players
People from Maysville, Kentucky
People from Elmwood Park, Illinois